The Precision 165 is an American trailerable sailboat that was designed by Jim Taylor as a pocket cruiser and first built in 1995.

Production
The design was built by Precision Boat Works in Palmetto, Florida, United States from 1995 until 2018, but it is now out of production.

Design
The Precision 165 is a recreational keelboat, built predominantly of fiberglass, with wood trim. It has a fractional sloop rig with three stays and no spreaders. The hull has a raked stem, a slightly reverse transom, a transom-hung rudder controlled by a tiller and a fixed shoal draft keel with a weighted lead bulb and endplates. It displaces  and carries  of ballast. It has foam flotation, making it unsinkable.

The boat is normally fitted with a small  outboard motor for docking and maneuvering.

The design has sleeping accommodation for two people, with two straight settee berths in the main cabin.

Operational history
In a 2010 review Steve Henkel wrote, "Designer Jim Taylor was one of the leading designers of America’s Cup boats in the 1990s. He has plenty of technical expertise, a good eye for what looks right in a small boat design, and has drawn a number of successful pocket cruisers. For some time he has been the designer of record for Precision Boatworks. The Precision 165 is the smallest cruising boat in the company's line. Best features: The P165 has a bigger beam, heavier ballast, and a fixed lead keel with 'end-plate effect' bulb compared with her peers' centerboards, plus the largest SA/D and lowest D/L in the comp[etitor] group. These differences help to make this boat relatively stiff and fast in a breeze. A simple three-stay rig (with no spreaders) makes rigging at the ramp easier and faster. Relatively short overhangs contribute for more manageable storage, especially in a one-car garage. Quality Harken blocks, vang sheeting arrangement, and a forward hatch are all nice features. Worst features: Fixed keel is less convenient at the launching ramp."

In a 2002 review naval architect Robert Perry concluded of the design, "entry-level boats, like entry-level guitars, must perform well enough to teach beginners the potential joys of playing. The Precision 165 would be a great way to get started in the sport of sailing."

See also
List of sailing boat types

References

External links

Keelboats
1990s sailboat type designs
Sailing yachts
Trailer sailers
Sailboat type designs by Jim Taylor Yacht Designs
Sailboat types built by Precision Boat Works